Anhembi is a Brazilian municipality in the state of São Paulo. The population is 6,819 (2020 est.) in an area of 737 km².

The municipality contains the  Barreiro Rico Ecological Station, created in 2006 to protect an area of Atlantic Forest and its primate population.

References

Sources

Municipalities in São Paulo (state)